Chauncey W. Brownell (October 7, 1847 – February 4, 1938) was a Vermont attorney and politician who served as President of the Vermont State Senate and Vermont Secretary of State.

Biography
Chauncey Wells Brownell was born in Williston, Vermont on October 7, 1847, the son of Chauncey Wells Brownell (1811–1892) and Laura Chapin Higbee Brownell (1815–1852).  The elder Brownell was a farmer who served in both the Vermont House of Representatives and Vermont Senate.

The younger Brownell graduated from the University of Vermont in 1870 and Albany Law School in 1872.  Brownell received a Master of Arts degree from UVM in 1873.

Brownell became a lawyer in Burlington.  He was also active in local businesses, including serving on the board of directors of Burlington's electric street railway, board of directors member of the Burlington Building and Loan Association, Vice President of the city's Home Savings Bank, and President of the Burlington Mutual Fire Insurance Company.

A Republican, he was Burlington's Grand Juror (municipal court prosecutor) for two years, and State's Attorney of Chittenden County from 1884 to 1886.  He served as Assistant Secretary of the Vermont Senate from 1874 to 1880, and Senate Secretary from 1880 to 1890.  In 1890 Brownell was elected Secretary of State, serving until 1898.

In 1900 Brownell was elected a Burlington Alderman.  In 1902 he was elected to one term in the Vermont Senate and was chosen to serve as President pro tempore.

Brownell died in Williston on February 4, 1938.  He was buried at Lakeview Cemetery in Burlington.

Family
In 1875, Brownell married Elva Maria Brigham (1850–1920).  They were the parents of four children – Carl, Elva, Chauncey, and Henry.

References

External links
 

1847 births
1938 deaths
Politicians from Burlington, Vermont
University of Vermont alumni
Albany Law School alumni
Vermont lawyers
State's attorneys in Vermont
Republican Party Vermont state senators
Presidents pro tempore of the Vermont Senate
Secretaries of State of Vermont
Burials at Lakeview Cemetery (Burlington, Vermont)